Sale is a town in the Metropolitan Borough of Trafford, Greater Manchester, England.  The town and its adjacent area of Ashton upon Mersey contain 27 listed buildings that are recorded in the National Heritage List for England.  Of these, two are listed at Grade II*, the middle grade, and the others are at Grade II, the lowest grade.  With the arrival of the railway in 1849, the town became a commuter area for Manchester.  It contains a variety of listed buildings, which include houses, farmhouses, churches and associated structures, the railway station, public houses, a bank, a cinema, a footbridge, and three war memorials.


Key

Buildings

References

Citations

Sources

Lists of listed buildings in Greater Manchester
Listed